Jõelähtme Parish is a rural municipality in Harju County, north-western Estonia.

The administrative centre of Jõelähtme Parish is Jõelähtme village. It is located 20 km east from the centre of Estonia's capital, Tallinn.

History
Established in 1816.

During World War II, 6,000 Jews and Roma were murdered by Estonian Nazi collaborators under German supervision. Mass executions were carried out on sand dunes called Kalevi-Liiva where a memorial has been erected.

Local government
Current mayor is Andrus Umboja and chairman of the council is Art Kuum.

Religion

Geography

Settlements
There are 2 small boroughs (est: alevikud, sg. - alevik) and 34 villages (est: külad, sg. - küla) in Jõelähtme Parish.

Small boroughs: Kostivere, Loo.

Villages: Aruaru, Haapse, Haljava, Ihasalu, Iru, Jägala, Jägala-Joa, Jõelähtme, Jõesuu, Kaberneeme, Kallavere, Koila, Koipsi, Koogi, Kostiranna, Kullamäe, Liivamäe, Loo, Maardu, Manniva, Neeme, Nehatu, Parasmäe, Rammu, Rebala, Rohusi, Ruu, Saha, Sambu, Saviranna, Ülgase, Uusküla, Vandjala, Võerdla.

Landmarks

Jägala Waterfall
Rebala Heritage Reserve
Kostivere karst area
Jõelähtme church
Kaberneeme beach
Kalevi-Liiva memorial
Ülgase caves

Gallery

References

External links
Official website (in Estonian)
Map of Jõelähtme Parish
Non-official public forum (in Estonian)

 
Municipalities of Estonia
Holocaust locations in Estonia